The United States Federal Budget for Fiscal Year 1998, was a spending request by President Bill Clinton to fund government operations for October 1997 – September 1998. Figures shown in the spending request do not reflect the actual appropriations for Fiscal Year 1998, which must be authorized by Congress.

Total Receipts

(in billions of dollars)

Total Outlays
Outlays by budget function
(in millions)

References

External links
 Status of Appropriations Legislation for Fiscal Year 1998

1998
1998 in American politics
United States federal budget